Clavus heryi is a species of sea snail, a marine gastropod mollusc in the family Drilliidae.

Description
The length of the shell attains 12 mm.

Distribution
This marine species occurs off Madagascar.

References

 Bozzetti L. (2007) Tylotiella heryi e Tylotiella androyensis (Gastropoda: Hypsogastropoda: Drilliidae) nuove specie dal Madagascar Meridionale. Malacologia Mostra Mondiale 54: 6–8

External links

heryi
Gastropods described in 2007